Rhizophagus minutus is a species of root-eating beetle in the family Monotomidae. It is found in North America.

Subspecies
These two subspecies belong to the species Rhizophagus minutus:
 Rhizophagus minutus minutus Mannerheim, 1853
 Rhizophagus minutus rotundicollis Bousquet, 1990

References

Further reading

 
 

Monotomidae
Articles created by Qbugbot
Beetles described in 1853